The Imperial State Crown is one of the Crown Jewels of the United Kingdom and symbolises the sovereignty of the monarch.

It has existed in various forms since the 15th century. The current version was made in 1937 and is worn by the monarch after a coronation (St Edward's Crown having been used to crown the monarch) and used at the  State Openings of Parliament.

The crown is adorned with 2,901 precious stones, including the Cullinan II diamond, St Edward's Sapphire, the Stuart Sapphire, and the Black Prince's Ruby.

History

Origin
St Edward's Crown, used to crown English monarchs, was considered to be a holy relic, kept in the saint's shrine at Westminster Abbey and therefore not worn by monarchs at any other time. Instead, a "great crown" with crosses and fleurs-de-lis, but without arches (an open crown), was a king's usual headgear at state occasions until the time of Henry V, who is depicted wearing an imperial crown of state with gold arches (a closed crown). Arches were a symbol of sovereignty, and by this point in history, the king of England was being celebrated as rex in regno suo est imperator – an emperor of his own domain – owing obedience to no one but God, unlike some continental rulers, who owed fealty to more powerful kings, or to the Holy Roman Emperor.

Henry VII or his son and successor Henry VIII may have commissioned a more elaborate version of the state crown which is first described in detail in an inventory of royal jewels in 1521, and again in 1532, 1550, 1574, and 1597, and was included in a painting by Daniel Mytens of Charles I in 1631. The Tudor Crown had more pearls and jewels than its medieval predecessor, and the centre petals of each of the fleurs-de-lis had images of Christ, the Virgin Mary, and St George. The crown weighed 3.3 kg (7 lb 6 oz) and was set with 168 pearls, 58 rubies, 28 diamonds, 19 sapphires, and 2 emeralds.

Following the abolition of the monarchy and the execution of Charles I in 1649, the Tudor Crown was broken up by order of Oliver Cromwell during the Interregnum, and its valuable components were sold for £1,100.

Restoration to present day
Upon the Restoration of the monarchy in 1660, a new state crown was made for Charles II by Sir Robert Vyner. About 10 versions of the crown have existed since the Restoration. The one made for Queen Victoria in 1838 is the basis for today's crown. Made by Rundell and Bridge in 1838 using old and new jewels, it had a crimson velvet cap with ermine border and a lining of white silk.

At the State Opening of Parliament in 1845, the Duke of Argyll was carrying the crown before Queen Victoria when it fell off the cushion and broke. Victoria wrote in her diary, "it was all crushed and squashed like a pudding that had sat down". The empty frame of Victoria's imperial state crown survives in the Royal Collection. 

A new crown was made for the coronation of George VI in 1937 by Garrard & Co.

The crown was adjusted for Queen Elizabeth II's coronation in 1953, with the head size reduced and the arches lowered by 25 mm (1 inch) to give it a more feminine appearance.
It is expected that the crown will be remade for the coronation of Charles III on 6 May 2023, with the arches being raised to their original height and the head size being adjusted.

Description

The Imperial State Crown is 31.5 cm (12.4 in) tall and weighs 1.06 kg (2.3 lb), and has four fleurs-de-lis and four crosses pattée, supporting two arches topped by a monde and cross pattée. Its purple velvet cap is trimmed with ermine. The frame is made of gold, silver and platinum, and decorated with 2,868 diamonds, 273 pearls, 17 sapphires, 11 emeralds, and 5 rubies.

Notable stones are St Edward's Sapphire on the top cross, reputedly taken from the ring of Edward the Confessor when he was re-interred at Westminster Abbey in 1163, and the Black Prince's Ruby (a large spinel) on the front cross. In 1909, the 104-carat (21 g) Stuart Sapphire, set in the front of the crown, was moved to the back and replaced by the 317-carat (63 g) Cullinan II. Below the monde hang four pearls, three of which are often said to have belonged to Queen Elizabeth I, but the association is almost certainly erroneous.

Usage
The crown is worn by the monarch on leaving Westminster Abbey at the end of his or her coronation. It is usually also worn at State Openings of Parliament, although Elizabeth II wore a hat in March 1974, June 2017 and December 2019 after snap general elections, and in May 2021; and, in October 2019 she wore the State Diadem, while the Imperial State Crown was carried beside her. Usually, it is taken to the Palace of Westminster under armed guard in its own carriage and placed in the Robing Room, where the monarch dons the Robe of State and puts on the crown before giving the speech to Parliament. If a State Opening occurs before a coronation, the crown is placed on a cushion beside the monarch. In 1689, one week after being proclaimed king, William III wore his crown in Parliament to pass the Crown and Parliament Recognition Act 1689. When not in use, the Imperial State Crown is on public display in the Jewel House at the Tower of London.

Gallery

See also
 Imperial Crown of India

References

Bibliography

External links

 The Crown Jewels at the Royal Family website

1937 works
Crown Jewels of the United Kingdom
Individual crowns
Coronation of George VI and Elizabeth